Wolde Selassie Harris (born 26 January 1974 in Kingston) is a Jamaican football coach and former player. He played as a striker in Major League Soccer and was the 1996 A-League  MVP & Rookie of the Year.  He earned twenty-eight caps with the Jamaica national team.

Club career
Harris played college soccer for his freshman year at the University of Connecticut and then transferred to Clemson University, leaving as the college's all-time leading scorer with 76 goals in three years. He joined MLS for the first time in 1997, after spending 1996 with the Colorado Foxes, leading the A-League in goals with 17. Harris played three seasons with the Colorado Rapids, scoring 13 goals in 1998. In 2000, he was traded to the New England Revolution for draft picks. Wolde's best season with the Revs was his first, when he scored 15 goals. Harris would spend three and a half season in New England, before a trade to the Kansas City Wizards midway through 2003. He spent 2004 with Swedish club Bodens BK before coming back to MLS and Colorado in 2005. In eight years in MLS league play, Harris scored 51 goals and added 31 assists. He signed for Salvadoran outfit Club Deportivo FAS in August 2006 and retired at the end of the season.

International career
Harris has also played for the Jamaica national team, earning over 25 caps and scoring 7 goals. He participated in world cup qualifiers, tournaments, and numerous friendlies. He played his last international game against Guadeloupe in 2002 in the Caribbean Cup where the Reggae Boyz were crowned Champions.

Coaching career
Wolde Harris has been involved in youth football in the United States and Jamaica.  In December 2009, he launch a company called Jamaica Grassroots football company with his father and brothers.  Harris and along with his father and two brothers also coached at traditional Jamaican football powerhouse, Kingston College.  Harris joined the staff of Clemson University in 2011 as a student assistant coach and continued to help the Tigers through 2012.

On 26 February 2021, Harris joined Major League Soccer side Colorado Rapids as an assistant coach.

Personal life
Wolde Harris is the son of Kingston College, Michigan State University and Jamaica soccer legend, Trevor "Jumpy" Harris.

References

External links

 Charleston Battery stats

American Professional Soccer League players
Bodens BK players
Charleston Battery players
Clemson Tigers men's soccer players
Colorado Foxes players
Colorado Rapids players
Colorado Springs Switchbacks FC coaches
Expatriate footballers in El Salvador
Expatriate footballers in Sweden
Expatriate soccer players in Canada
Expatriate soccer players in the United States
C.D. FAS footballers
Association football forwards
Jamaica international footballers
Jamaican expatriate footballers
Jamaican expatriate sportspeople in Canada
Jamaican expatriate sportspeople in Sweden
Jamaican expatriate sportspeople in the United States
Jamaican footballers
Major League Soccer players
Sporting Kansas City players
New England Revolution players
Sportspeople from Kingston, Jamaica
Winnipeg Alliance players
1974 births
Living people
Jamaican expatriate sportspeople in El Salvador
USL Championship coaches
Jamaican football managers
Colorado Rapids non-playing staff
Clemson Tigers men's soccer coaches